The Academicians of the Royal Academy (also known as Life School of the Royal Academy) is an oil painting executed in 1771–72 by Johan Zoffany. The group portrait was produced shortly after the foundation of the Royal Academy of Arts in London in 1769. It portrays 34 of the early members of the Royal Academy preparing for a life drawing class with a nude male life model. The two female founding academicians – Angelica Kauffmann and Mary Moser – are not shown as present, as it would have been inappropriate for them to attend a life drawing class in person: rather, Zoffany includes them by showing their portraits hanging on the walls.

Description
The oil on canvas painting measures . It may have been commissioned by George III and it is held in the Royal Collection. It draws inspiration from Raphael's School of Athens, with the artist Joshua Reynolds and the anatomist William Hunter taking the roles of Plato and Aristotle in a new "School of London".

The painting depicts the academy's cluttered drawing room at Old Somerset House, demolished from 1775 – a working space not a show space, decorated with various paintings and casts of statues. A nude male life model has taken a pose on a platform to the right. A second male model is shown in the act of removing his clothes, in the pose of the Spinario sculpture. An hourglass times each pose, but also acts as a memento mori, that life is short but art is long ("Ars longa, vita brevis"). The main source of light is a large oil lamp hanging from the ceiling, creating deep shadows on the walls: its flames show the colours of a Newtonian spectrum. A table running round the edge of the room has individual shaded candleholders for each of the artists.

Subjects
The Academicians depicted (all founder members in 1768 unless noted) are:

 George Barret Sr. 
 Francesco Bartolozzi
 Edward Burch (1771)
 Agostino Carlini
 Charles Catton (the Elder)
 Mason Chamberlin
 Sir William Chambers
 Giovanni Battista Cipriani
 Richard Cosway (1771)
 John Gwynn
 Francis Hayman
 William Hoare (1769)
 Nathaniel Hone the Elder
 William Hunter
 Angelica Kauffmann (portrait)
 Jeremiah Meyer
 George Michael Moser
 Mary Moser (portrait)
 Francis Milner Newton
 Joseph Nollekens (1772)
 Edward Penny
 Sir Joshua Reynolds
 John Inigo Richards
 Paul Sandby
 Thomas Sandby
 Dominic Serres (the Elder)
 Peter Toms
 William Tyler
 Samuel Wale
 Benjamin West
 Richard Wilson
 Joseph Wilton
 Richard Yeo
 Johan Zoffany (1769)
 Francesco Zuccarelli

They are distributed around the room, most conversing rather than drawing or painting.  Sir Joshua Reynolds, the President of the Royal Academy, is in black to the left of centre, with his ear trumpet.  Zoffany became a Royal Academician in 1769, and he includes himself as a self portrait at the far left, with his palette.  He is balanced on the right side of the painting by the second model and a fragment of marble torso.

Also included with the Royal Academicians is the Chinese artist Tan-Che-Qua – fifth from the left – who was visiting London at the time, and two life models.

Five founder members of the Royal Academy are not depicted: John Baker (died 1771), Francis Cotes (died 1770), George Dance the Younger, Nathaniel Dance, and Thomas Gainsborough.

See also
 List of Royal Academicians

References
 Johan Zoffany, The Academicians of the Royal Academy, 1771–72, Royal Collection
 Key to The Academicians of the Royal Academy, by John Sanders, after Johan Joseph Zoffany, National Portrait Gallery
 The Academicians of the Royal Academy, watercolour by John Sanders, after Johan Joseph Zoffany

Royal Academy
Paintings in the Royal Collection of the United Kingdom
Paintings by Johann Zoffany
1772 paintings